Academy of the Sacred Heart may refer to:

Academy of the Sacred Heart, Bloomfield Hills, Michigan
Academy of the Sacred Heart, Grand Coteau, Louisiana
Academy of the Sacred Heart (New Orleans, Louisiana)
Buffalo Academy of the Sacred Heart, Amherst, New York
Sacred Heart Academy (Redlands, California)
Sacred Heart Academy (Hamden, Connecticut)
Sacred Heart Academy (Kentucky), Louisville, Kentucky
Academy of the Sacred Heart (New Jersey), Hoboken, New Jersey
Sacred Heart Academy (New York), Hempstead, New York
Sacred Heart Academy (Cincinnati, Ohio)
Sacred Heart Academy High School (Mt. Pleasant, Michigan) 
Sacred Hearts Academy, Hawai'i
Flintridge Sacred Heart Academy, La Canada, California

See also 
 Sacred Heart school (disambiguation)
 Sacred Heart (disambiguation)